USIA or Usia may refer to:

 Usia, Dildarnagar, Uttar Pradesh, India
 United States Information Agency
 Administration for Soviet Property in Austria
 Usia A genus of fly from the family Bombyliidae.